Magic Numbers is a British television game show which aired for one series of seven episodes in July and August 2010.

Show format 
The show is hosted by magician Stephen Mulhern, who was joined each week by a number of celebrity guests. In the first part of each episode, the celebrity guests answered questions or took part in challenges to generate a sequence of 6 numbers. Members of the public then called a Premium-rate telephone number if their home or mobile phone number contained two or more of these digits. Callers were entered into a prize draw, the winner of which would compete in the final round for a prize of up to £350,000. Throughout the show, Mulhern would also perform a number of magic tricks or illusions, assisted by some of that week's celebrity guests. While the initial public phone-in was taking place, Mulhern would also perform a featured grand illusion, again assisted by one or more of that week's celebrity guests.

The highest prize won by a contestant was £290,000, won by Pamela Mullins from Sheffield, Yorkshire.

Similarity to previous ITV game shows 
The show was very similar to a previous ITV game show, Talking Telephone Numbers, the key difference being that viewers of Magic Numbers could call in if two of the numbers matched their phone number, rather than five as on the previous show. This was a technique employed by ITV to generate more calls, and hence higher revenues from the show.

The show was created by CPL Productions and Paul Brassey and commissioned by John Kaye Cooper at ITV.

Episode guide

References

External links 

2010s British game shows
2010 British television series debuts
2010 British television series endings
ITV game shows
ITV (TV network) original programming
Television series by Sony Pictures Television
English-language television shows